Philip Sesemann is a British long-distance runner and NHS doctor. Sesemann was the first British finisher at the 2021 London Marathon in his marathon debut, clocking 2:12:58 to finish in 7th place.

Athletics career

Track career
From 2010 to 2020, Sesemann mostly competed in track events ranging from 800m to 5000m. Sesemann was famous throughout the athletics community for starting a track season in strong form and frequently falling apart and fading out by August, resulting in lackluster performances. Notable occasions were both at the Woodside stadium in Watford, where in 2017 he finished last over 1500m in a time of 3.57.27  and second last over the same distance in 2018 with a time of 3.51.17   In 2021, Sesemann represented Great Britain at the European Athletics Indoor Championships in Toruń, Poland, placing 5th in his heat of the 3000m, but not qualifying for the final.

Road Transition
On 3 April 2021, he raced the Podium 5k in Barrowford, UK, where he placed 2nd in 13:40, one second behind Tom Mortimer. On 22 August, he made his half marathon debut at The Big Half in London, placing 4th in 1:02:47. The race was won by Jake Smith. On 19 September, Sesemann won the Trafford 10k in Manchester in 29:29.

On 3 October 2021, Sesemann raced his marathon debut at the 2021 London Marathon, where he placed 7th in 2:12:58.

On 2 October 2022, Sesemann raced the 2022 London Marathon, where he placed 10th in 2:12:10.

References 

Living people
Place of birth missing (living people)
British long-distance runners
National Health Service people
1992 births